Rotovator can mean:
Momentum exchange tether#Rotovator, an alternative name for a tether propulsion apparatus, a proposed method of lifting materials into orbit using very long tethers attached to a rotating satellite
Rotovator, an alternative name for a rotary tiller, a machine for digging earth, named from a manufacturer of such implements